Khaseem Greene (born February 4, 1989) is a former American football linebacker. He was drafted by the Chicago Bears in the fourth round of the 2013 NFL Draft. He played college football at Rutgers.

Early years
Greene was born in Elizabeth, New Jersey.  He attended Elizabeth High School, where he played high school football for the Elizabeth Minutemen. He also had a postgraduate year at Avon Old Farms school in Avon Connecticut where he was a standout in basketball, football and track. During his time at Avon Old Farms he was part of the school's first ever New England track championship along with former New York Giants running back Michael Cox.

College career
While attending Rutgers University, Greene played for the Rutgers Scarlet Knights football team from 2008 to 2012.  As a junior in 2011, he switched from safety to weakside linebacker.  He led the Big East Conference with 141 tackles, 3.5 sacks and two forced fumbles.  As a senior in 2012, Greene recorded 136 tackles and six sacks with two interceptions, six forced fumbles and two touchdowns via fumble recoveries, and was named the Big East Defensive Player of the Year and a first-team All-American by ESPN.

Professional career

Chicago Bears

Greene was drafted in the fourth round (117th pick overall) by the Chicago Bears, the second linebacker taken by the team.  He signed a four-year contract with the Bears on May 2, 2013. Greene signed a four-year, $2.592 million contract. The deal included a $432,092 signing bonus.

Greene made his NFL debut in week nine against the Green Bay Packers in place of the injured Lance Briggs, recording four tackles. Greene concluded 2013 with 38.5 tackles, an interception, and a forced fumble. In March 2014, Greene tweeted that he will change his number from #59 to #52, in honor of Rutgers teammate Eric LeGrand. On May 11, 2015, he was waived by the Bears.

Tampa Bay Buccaneers
Greene was claimed off waivers by the Tampa Bay Buccaneers on May 12, 2015. He was released by the Buccaneers on September 4, 2015.

Detroit Lions
On November 18, 2015, Greene was signed to the Lions' practice squad. On January 4, 2016, Greene signed a futures contract with the Detroit Lions. On September 3, 2016, he was waived by the Lions.

Kansas City Chiefs
On January 21, 2017, Greene signed a futures contract with the Chiefs. On May 9, 2017, he was waived by the Chiefs.

Massachusetts Pirates
He was signed by the Massachusetts Pirates on November 9, 2019.

Personal life
Greene's half-brother, Ray Graham, is a running back who played college football for the Pittsburgh Panthers and who has played in the NFL. Their father is Raymond Graham. Greene has a daughter.

References

External links
Chicago Bears bio
Scarlet Knights bio

1989 births
Living people
All-American college football players
American football safeties
American football linebackers
Elizabeth High School (New Jersey) alumni
Rutgers Scarlet Knights football players
Sportspeople from Elizabeth, New Jersey
Players of American football from New Jersey
Chicago Bears players
Tampa Bay Buccaneers players
Detroit Lions players
Kansas City Chiefs players
Avon Old Farms alumni